The following lists events that happened during 1961 in the Imperial State of Iran.

Incumbents
 Shah: Mohammad Reza Pahlavi 
 Prime Minister: Jafar Sharif-Emami (until May 5), Ali Amini (starting May 5)

Events

Births
 24 March – Rita, singer.
 21 October – Alireza Akbari, politician (died 2023)
Ali Alilu, politician
Mohammad Hosein Farhanghi, politician.

See also
 Years in Iraq
 Years in Afghanistan

References

 
Iran
Years of the 20th century in Iran
1960s in Iran
Iran